Macormack Charles Farrell Easmon, OBE, popularly known as M. C. F. Easmon or "Charlie" (11 April 1890 – 2 May 1972), was a Sierra Leone Creole born in Accra in the Gold Coast (modern-day Ghana), where his father John Farrell Easmon, a prominent Creole medical doctor, was working at the time. He belonged to the notable Easmon family of Sierra Leone, a Creole family of African-American descent.

Background and early life

Macormack Charles Farrell Easmon was born on 11 April 1890 in Accra, Gold Coast, to John Farrell Easmon, a Sierra Leonean of African-American and Irish descent and his wife, Kathleen Annette Easmon (née Smith), a Sierra Leonean of Jamaican Maroon, Fante, and English descent. Macormack Easmon descended from prominent Sierra Leonean families and had numerous ancestors who distinguished themselves in the civil service and medical field. Easmon was named "McCormack" or "MacCormac" after his great-grandfather John MacCormac, who was the uncle of  William MacCormac.

John Farrell Easmon (1856–1900) was a prominent Sierra Leonean medical doctor with a distinguished medical career, who was the first West African to serve as Chief Medical Officer of a British West African territory. The Easmon family are Sierra Leone Creoles who descend from the original settlers of the Freetown Colony, the Nova Scotian Settlers. Macormack Easmon's paternal uncle was Albert Whiggs Easmon, a prominent gynaecologist in Freetown. Through his maternal lineage, J. F. Easmon was descended from the MacCormac family and was a nephew of Sir William MacCormac.

William Smith Jr. was the son of Judge William Smith, a Yorkshireman who settled on the Gold Coast and was a judge in the Mixed Commissionary Court in Freetown. Anne Spilsbury was the daughter of Joseph Green Spilsbury and Hannah Carew. J. G. Spilsbury's father was George Green Spilsbury, a distant relative of Bernard Spilsbury, and Elizabeth Fowler, a Jamaican Maroon woman. Hannah Carew was the daughter of Thomas and Betsy Carew, both Liberated Africans.

Education
Easmon was educated for six months at the CMS Grammar School in Freetown and later at Colet Court School, the preparatory school for St Paul's Preparatory School in London. He went on to attend Epsom College in Surrey. After graduating in 1907, Macormack Easmon was awarded a scholarship to study medicine at the Medical School of St. Mary's Hospital in London.

After a distinguished academic career, Easmon qualified in medicine and surgery in 1912, and in the following year passed the examination of the London School of Tropical Medicine.

Personal life
In 1920, Easmon married Enid Winifred Shorunukeh-Sawyerr, daughter of a prominent Creole family. They had one child, Charles Syrett Farrell Easmon, who became a professor in medical studies in the United Kingdom.

Relatives
Through his mother, Easmon was the nephew of Adelaide Casely-Hayford.
Easmon was a first cousin of Raymond Sarif Easmon. 
Easmon was the uncle of Charles Odamtten Easmon, the first Ghanaian surgeon.

Retirement and legacy
As a member of the Sierra Leone Society, he spearheaded the founding of the Sierra Leone Museum in 1958 and became its first curator. Easmon was also instrumental in the Monuments and Relics Commission alongside other Sierra Leoneans such as Ernest Jenner Wright and Wilmot A. Dillsworth, a Freetown city town clerk. Easmon worked relentlessly to acquire worthy exhibits for the museum and to set up attractive displays. He also hosted a popular radio programme called Sierra Leone in Retrospect.

In 1954, Easmon was awarded the Order of the British Empire (OBE).

References

 The Krio Descendants Yunion.

External links
 "Film clip of Dr M.C.F. Easmon discussing the founding of Freetown".

1890 births
1972 deaths
Sierra Leone Creole people
Macormack Charles Farrell
Expatriates of Sierra Leone in Gold Coast (British colony)
Sierra Leonean expatriates in the United Kingdom
People educated at Epsom College
MacCormac family of County Armagh, Northern Ireland